Kato Grammatiko (before 1927: Γραμματίκοβον - Grammatikovon) is a village in Pella regional unit, Macedonia, Greece.

The Greek census (1920) recorded 842 people in the village and in 1923 there were 510 inhabitants who were Muslim. Following the Greek-Turkish population exchange, in 1926 within Kato Grammatikovon there were 31 refugee families from Asia Minor and 27 refugee families from Pontus. The Greek census (1928) recorded 878 village inhabitants. There were 47 refugee families (186 people) in 1928.

The village has an Ottoman era two story, four sided fortification tower (built 17th century) and in 2002, it was declared a protected monument.

References

Populated places in Pella (regional unit)
Edessa, Greece